Qian Gorlos Mongol Autonomous County, or simply Qian Gorlos County, commonly abbreviated as Qianguo County, is a county of northwestern Jilin province, China. It is under the administration of Songyuan City. Gorlos Mongols live here. Formerly known as, Gorlos Front Banner.

Geography and climate
Qian Gorlos has a monsoon-influenced humid continental climate (Köppen Dwa), with long, bitterly cold and very dry winters and hot, humid summers. Over two-thirds of the annual precipitation occurs from June to August, with barely any in the winter months. With monthly percent possible sunshine ranging from 52% in July to 68% in February and March, the area receives 2,732 hours of bright sunshine annually.

Administrative divisions
The county administers eight towns and 14 townships.

Towns:
Qian Gorlos Town, Changshan, Qaiborig, Ulantuga, Chaganhua, Wangfuzhan, Balang, Halamodu

Townships:
Baodian Township, Pingfeng Township, Mongol Eili Township, Daliba Township, Jilat Township, Baiyilaga Township, Hongquan Township, Eru Township, Tauhote Township, Changlong Township, Ulantala Township, Dongsanjiazi Township, Hotmangha Township, Ulan'odur Township

Transport
G12 Hunchun–Ulanhot Expressway
G45 Daqing–Guangzhou Expressway
China National Highway 203
China National Highway 302

References

External links

County-level divisions of Jilin
Mongol autonomous counties